This is the discography of rap group Slaughterhouse composed of rappers Royce da 5'9", Joe Budden, Joell Ortiz, and Crooked I. It consists of 2 studio albums, 9 singles, 1 extended play, 2 mixtapes and 9 music videos.

Slaughterhouse's debut studio album, Slaughterhouse, was released on August 11, 2009 on E1 Music. It peaked at number 25 on the US Billboard 200.

The second studio album and major label debut, Welcome to: Our House, was released on August 28, 2012 on Shady Records and peaked at number two on the Billboard 200. The album's second single, "My Life", peaked at number 8 on the US Bubbling Under Hot 100 Singles and peaked at number 87 on Canadian Hot 100. "Throw That", the album's fourth single, peaked at number 98 on the US Billboard Hot 100 and peaked at number 69 on Canadian Hot 100. "Goodbye" and "Throw It Away," however, did not chart.

Albums

Studio albums

Compilation albums

EPs

Mixtapes

Singles

As lead artist

Guest appearances

Music videos

See also

 Royce da 5'9" discography
 Joe Budden discography
 Joell Ortiz discography
 Crooked I discography

Notes

References 

Discographies of American artists
Hip hop discographies